General Education Academy, also known as GEA, is an English-language medium school located in Chembur, Mumbai, India. The school follows the SSC curriculum prescribed by the Maharashtra board. The General Education Academy Trust was founded in June 1963.

Campus
There are two cameras in every classroom and three in the corridor. The school has an AV room, science lab, and a computer lab.
The campus is surrounded by lush greens which makes the students relieved and fresh. the classrooms are well ventilated and with enough sunlight in every classroom. The computer lab is well equipped with necessary gadgets.

Golden Jubilee celebrations
The school celebrated its 50-year anniversary on 27 September 2014. It hosted a program at the Fine Arts Gallery, Chembur, Mumbai. The program was attended by the school principal, alumni and former teachers.

SSC curriculum
The school is affiliated to the SSC Board of Maharashtra. Subjects offered include English as a First Language, Marathi as a Second Language, Hindi, History, Geography, Algebra, Geometry, and Science as prescribed by the SSC Maharashtra Board.

Activities
The school has a Parliament of its own, with a prime minister as its head, and his assembly.
Various competitions like inter school chess, carrom, drawing, table tennis are held for sports.
Educational competitions like science quiz, computer quiz, social studies quiz, general knowledge quizzes are held for educational upliftment and a sense of competition to develop amongst students.
Students who perform good in science and technology are sent for zonal level science quizzes and ward level science project and fairs.
The school gives equal opportunity to every student and encourages them to realize their potential and help nurture it with offering a platform to showcase it and improve themselves.

Other schools
 Adarsha Vidyalaya
 AFAC High School,Chembur
 Amchi Shala
 Chembur Karnatak High School
 Holy Family High School
 Lokmanya Tilak High School
 Our Lady of Perpetual Succour High School
 Saraswati Mahavidyalaya

See also
 List of schools in Mumbai

Educational institutions established in 1963
Schools in Chembur
Education in Mumbai
1963 establishments in Maharashtra